Jothi is a 2022 Tamil-language emotional investigation thriller film directed by AV Krishna Paramatma, starring Vetri, Sheela, Krisha Kurup, S P Rajasethupathi and Mime Gopi  in the leading roles. The film was released on 28 July 2022.

Plot 
Aruljothi (Sheela Rajkumar) is a young pregnant woman who has her delivery in 4 days. The movie opens on a night where her husband Ashwin (Naan Saravannan) a doctor,who has to attend an emergency case so he leaves his wife Jothi . The scene cuts to unknown person stitching Jothi's tummy and Janaki,who lives opposite calling the police. Sakthi (Vetri) a police man, arrives at the scene to see, someone has stolen her unborn baby. He alerts other police officers to search the streets and to catch anyone looking suspicious. Sakthi informs her husband who is on his way to the hospital Jothi is admitted at.

At 01:39am, Sakthi and Muthu (Elango Kumaravel) who is a constable, enter Jothi's house to search and they find some evidence. In a flashback, it is revealed Sakthi's wife is Janaki and they both live on the opposite road. Both families are friends and Janaki arranged a baby shower for Jothi since Jothi does not have parents. It is also revealed Janaki cannot conceive naturally. When Sakthi asks the doctor how Jothi is doing, the doctor says she is unconscious and the unknown person must be a professional due to the stitches on Jothi's tummy. When Muthu asks Janaki how her hand got hurt, she avoids the question and seems very anxious. When questioning Ashwin, Sakthi finds out Nisha, Jothi's sister, who doesn't like Jothi due to the wealth she inherited.  When they watch the CCTV footage, they see Ranga enter the house. Rangi works a pharmacy now but he used to work for Ashwin and Jothi before as a driver. He helps around with groceries and cleaning. When Ashwin asked why he is so attached to Jothi, he replies that he lost his older sister when he was younger and loved her a lot. He sees Jothi as his own sister. Before leaving the job, he asked to borrow 3 lakhs from Ashwin but Ashwin refused. After Ranga leaves, the CCTV footage stops working.

When questioning Ranga, he admits he went to her house to ask money from her as his mum needs a kidney transplant. He recounts Nisha arguing with Jothi and even threatening that she will kill her for the wealth. They question Nisha and she reveals they are not blood sisters. Jothi was adopted from an orphanage as her parents couldn't give birth naturally. But few years later, Nisha was born. Nisha tells Sakthi she has a doubt on someone who stalked Jothi and Nisha when they went out. They pull Ashwin's hospital CCTV to see his face and find out he regularly visits the hospital for his wife's check ups. His name is Arun Kumar. He broke the hospital windown and the hospital lodged a complaint against him. They get his address, only to find his older brother at the address. Arun Kumar, the younger brother, married Gayathri and she became pregnant soon. His older brother didn't have a child yet so Arun would look after Gayathri so carefully as it is the first child in the family. Near the delivery date of the baby, Arun had to leave for some urgent work. Even though, he was struggling financially, he always takes his wife to a private hospital as the facilities are better. When he came back from his work, both Gayathri and the baby had died due to some complications. The lab results from the blood collected at Jothi's house is shocking to Sakthi and the scientist says 2 blood groups were found, one who is 25 years old and another who is 32 years who are both females. One is A +ve and other is AB -ve. One belongs to Jothi who is A+ve, the other belongs to the criminal.

Muthu informs Sakthi he suspects Janaki. In flashbacks, it shows how much Janaki wanted a child and how depressed she was. Sakthi goes home and asks Janaki why she went there at that time and she explains she heard a different car noise, not of Ashwin's car and she heard a baby's cry. When she went to check it out, it was locked so entered via the back door where she claimed she hurt her hand. She also admits seeing Ashwin with another woman, who is Janaki's doctor and the managing director of Kamini hospitals, Kamini. She informed Jothi but Jothi didn't believe her and yelled at her. They stopped talking since then. She admits she was Ashwin's ex-lover and aborted so many times due to him forcing her. The lab scientist tells Sakthi that the suspect has Thalassemia, where they have to change their blood every 17 days if they are under 30. If they are above 30, they must replace their bone marrow. They narrow down the suspects and find out it is a woman called Shanti who works at Kamini hospital. She matches all the evidence, where the suspect has Thalassemia, a professional medic, AB-ve, female and under 30 years old.

After thrashing Shanti by a policewoman, she admits that Ranga took her to Jothi's house but it was someone else who told her to do it. Sakthi confronts Jothi at the hospital with Ashwin, Nisha and Janaki. Sakthi reveals the person who said to do it was none other than Jothi herself. Jothi reveals her past and blames her husband for doing what she did. In the past, you see Jothi's dad hiding something from Jothi and hiding in the bureau. One day, she gets hold of what he was hiding and cries reading it. She finds out she is adopted and not her parent's real child. Back to the present after Janaki accusing her husband of cheating with Kamini, Jothi asks Ranga whether it's true and Ranga admits it is true.

Ranga reveals that Ashwin does not only hospital business but sells new born babies to rich couples. To make Ashwin understand the pain, Jothi gives the baby to one of the victim's family. Someone snatches the baby from Ranga and tries to murder it but Ranga saves it in times and gets beaten up in the process. It is revealed to be Arun Kumar's older brother. It turns out Arun Kumar died the same day he found about his wife and child's death. Sakthi saves the baby and returns it to Jothi. Jothi gives the baby to Janaki as Janaki had asked before if Jothi gets gifted with 2 children, she could give her one of the child.

Cast 
 Vetri as Sakthi - a police officer investigating the case, Janaki's husband
 Sheela Rajkumar as Arul Jothi - the young pregnant lady whose unborn baby was stolen from 
 Krisha Kurup as Janaki - Sakthi's wife who lives opposite to Jothi 
 Elango Kumaravel as Muthu Kumaraswamy - constable who helps Sakthi 
 Mime Gopi as Tamizharasu
 Naan Saravanan as Ashwin
 SP Rajasethupathi as Ranga

Production
The film's plot was based on a real-life kidnapping incident that took place in Cuddalore. The film was shot when the relaxations in COVID lockdown were issued in 2021. Notably, K. J. Yesudas sang a song for the film's album.

Release
The film released on 28 July 2022 across Tamil Nadu. A critic from Times of India called the film "an amateurish investigative thriller", adding "rather than give us a plausible investigative thriller, director Krishna Paramathma goes for melodrama and amateurish police work that dashes our hopes". A reviewer from Cinema Express noted it was "a shoddy, forgettable film" and "one of those true-incidents-inspired-films that never raises above mediocrity".

References

2022 films
2020s Tamil-language films
Indian action thriller films